Gergana may refer to:
 
 Gergana (Bulgarian singer), Bulgarian pop-folk singer
 Gergena Branzova, former professional basketball player
 Gergana Kochanova, first runner-up in the Miss Bulgaria 2007 contest
 Gergana Velinova, co-founder of the Bulgarian Children's Chorus and School Gergana
 Gerri Peev, British-Bulgarian journalist
 4102 Gergana, a main-belt asteroid
 Gergana, an opera by Georgi Atanasov
 Gergana (poem), a poem by Petko Slaveykov